Rab-interacting lysosomal protein is a protein that in humans is encoded by the RILP gene.

Function 

RILP, along with the GTPase RAB7 (MIM 602298), controls late endocytic transport.[supplied by OMIM]

Interactions 

RILP (gene) has been shown to interact with RAB7A.

References

Further reading